Andreas Henrisusanta, S.C.I. (June 7, 1935 – March 10, 2016) was an Indonesian prelate of the Roman Catholic Church who served as bishop 
of the Diocese of Tanjungkarang, Indonesia from 1979 to 2012.

Biography
Born in Wonosari, in present-day Indonesia, Henrisusanta joined to the Dehonians Fathers and was ordained to the priesthood for this Congregation on 2 July 1961. On August 29, 1975, he was appointed titular bishop of Ubaba and auxiliary of the Roman Catholic Diocese of Tanjungkarang, Indonesia, and was ordained on February 11, 1976. Three years later, on April 18, 1979, he became the bishop ordinary of the same diocese. He retired on July 6, 2012.

See also

Notes

1935 births
2016 deaths
20th-century Roman Catholic bishops in Indonesia
People from Gunung Kidul Regency
21st-century Roman Catholic bishops in Indonesia
Roman Catholic bishops of Tanjungkarang